Melville Glynn Downey (September 1, 1915 – January 30, 1976) was an American basketball player and coach. He was an All-American college player at Purdue University and played two professional seasons in the National Basketball League (NBL), front-runner to the modern NBA.

Downey played at Purdue from 1934 to 1937, earning second-team All-American honors from the Omaha World. He played the 1938–39 NBL season for the Indianapolis Kautskys and the 1939–40 season for the Hammond Ciesar All-Americans. He averaged 5.1 points per game over 37 NBL contests.

He died on January 30, 1976, at age 60.Pro Basketball Encyclopedia

References

External links
NBL stats

1915 births
1976 deaths
All-American college men's basketball players
American men's basketball players
Basketball players from Indiana
Guards (basketball)
Hammond Ciesar All-Americans players
High school basketball coaches in the United States
Indianapolis Kautskys players
People from Franklin, Indiana
Purdue Boilermakers men's basketball players